Moose Jaw River is a river in the Canadian province of Saskatchewan. It is located in the southern part of the province in a region called the Prairie Pothole Region of North America, which extends throughout three Canadian provinces and five U.S. states. It is also within Palliser's Triangle and the Great Plains ecoregion.

The Moose Jaw River drainage basin is one of five sub-basins that make up the Upper Qu'Appelle Watershed. Craven Dam at the village of Craven is the dividing point between the upper and lower watersheds of the Qu'Appelle River. The Qu'Appelle River system is part of the much larger Hudson Bay drainage basin.

Course 
From there, the river travels in a north-westerly direction following Highway 39 most of the way to the city of Moose Jaw. Several highways cross the river's path, including Highways 6, 334, 623, 339, 2, 1, and 301.

Tributaries 
There are two main tributaries of the Moose Jaw River. At the north end of the reservoir is Dunnet Regional Park.

The other main tributary is Thunder Creek. Thunder Creek begins near Lake Diefenbaker and travels in a south-easterly direction and meets up with the Moose Jaw River in the city of Moose Jaw. There are four shallow, marshy lakes, Paysen (Horfield), Kettlehut, Williams, and Pelican along Thunder Creek's course and four main tributaries, Allin Creek, Aquadell Creek, Sandy Creek, and Wilson Creek.

See also 
List of rivers of Saskatchewan
Hudson Bay drainage basin

References 

Rivers of Saskatchewan
Tributaries of Hudson Bay
Tributaries of the Assiniboine River